Robert Barber is a male former British gymnast.

Gymnastics career
Barber represented England in the all-around event and horizontal bar and won a bronze medal in the team event, at the 1994 Commonwealth Games in Victoria, British Columbia, Canada.

References

Living people
British male artistic gymnasts
Gymnasts at the 1994 Commonwealth Games
Commonwealth Games bronze medallists for England
Commonwealth Games medallists in gymnastics
Year of birth missing (living people)
Medallists at the 1994 Commonwealth Games